Paramblypterus is an extinct genus of  bony fish. This taxon would often fall under predation from Paleozoic tetrapods such as Sclerocephalus

See also

 Prehistoric fish
 List of prehistoric bony fish

References

Prehistoric bony fish genera
Carboniferous bony fish
Fossils of Germany